Stenomicra cogani is a species of fly belonging to the family Periscelididae.

It is native to Western Europe.

References

Periscelididae
Insects described in 1982